USAG may refer to:

United States Army Garrison
 United States Attorney General
 USA Gymnastics
 United States Agriculture Index Fund ticker